Steinebach an der Wied is an Ortsgemeinde – a community belonging to a Verbandsgemeinde – in the Westerwaldkreis in Rhineland-Palatinate, Germany.

Geography

Location
On the southern boundary of the Verbandsgemeinde of Hachenburg (a kind of collective municipality whose seat is in the like-named town), in the northwest of the Westerwaldkreis, on the Westerwald Lake Plateau and on the Wied lies the community of Steinebach an der Wied.

Constituent communities
Steinebach an der Wied's Ortsteile are Steinebach, Schmidthahn, Langenbaum and Seeburg.

Politics
The municipal council is made up of 13 council members, including the extraofficial mayor (Bürgermeister), who were elected in a majority vote in a municipal election on 13 June 2004.

Culture and sightseeing

Buildings
In the community are found the ruins of a castle, Burg Steinebach (on the Wied).

Economy and infrastructure

Steinebach an der Wied is linked to the long-distance road network by Bundesstraße 8, which also links the community with the middle centres of Hachenburg and Altenkirchen. The Autobahn interchanges Mogendorf and Dierdorf on the A 3 (Cologne–Frankfurt) can be reached by way of Bundesstraße 8/Bundesstraße 413. The Hennef interchange on the A 5 can be reached directly by Bundesstraße 8. The nearest InterCityExpress stop is the railway station at Montabaur on the Cologne-Frankfurt high-speed rail line.

References

External links
 Steinebach an der Wied in the collective municipality’s Web pages 

Municipalities in Rhineland-Palatinate
Westerwaldkreis